Hamburgo Velho (originally Hamburguer Berg) is considered the historical district of Novo Hamburgo, Brazil.

Novo Hamburgo